The Tub Full of Cats is a Big Finish Productions audio drama featuring Lisa Bowerman as Bernice Summerfield, a character from the spin-off media based on the long-running British science fiction television series Doctor Who.

Plot 
As the Braxiatel Collection faces destruction, Bernice returns with its founder, Irving Braxiatel... on a ship piloted by a crew of cats.

Cast
Bernice Summerfield - Lisa Bowerman
Braxiatel - Miles Richardson
Maggie - Sophie Louise Dann
Rogers - Nigel Pegram
Chanticleer - Diane Fletcher

External links
Big Finish Productions - Professor Bernice Summerfield: The Tub Full of Cats

Bernice Summerfield audio plays
Cats in popular culture
Fiction set in the 27th century